In mathematical set theory, an ω-Jónsson function for a set x of ordinals is a function  with the property that, for any subset y of x with the same cardinality as x, the restriction of  to  is surjective on . Jónsson functions are named for Bjarni Jónsson.

 showed that for every ordinal λ there is an ω-Jónsson function for λ.

Kunen's proof of Kunen's inconsistency theorem uses a Jónsson function for cardinals λ such that 2λ = λℵ0, and Kunen observed that for this special case there is a simpler proof of the existence of Jónsson functions.  gave a simple proof for the general case.

The existence of Jónsson functions shows that for any cardinal there is an algebra with an infinitary operation that has no proper subalgebras of the same cardinality. In particular if infinitary operations are allowed then an analogue of Jónsson algebras exists in any cardinality, so there are no infinitary analogues of Jónsson cardinals.

References

Set theory
Functions and mappings